The 2nd constituency of Eure is a French legislative constituency in the Eure département.
It contains the cantons of Brionne, Conches-en-Ouche, Le Neubourg and the cantons of Évreux (1, 2 and 3).

Deputies

Election Results

2022

 
 
 
 
 
 
 
|-
| colspan="8" bgcolor="#E9E9E9"|
|-

2017

2012

References

French legislative constituencies of Eure